50th Birthday Celebration Volume 9 (also referred to as The Classic Guide to Strategy Volume 3: The Fire Book) is a live album by John Zorn featuring a solo performance at Tonic in September 2003 that was part of his month-long 50th Birthday Celebration concert series. It is a continuation of his solo work documented on The Classic Guide to Strategy Volumes 1 & 2.

Reception

The Allmusic review by Sean Westergaard stated "Any fan of free improvisation or any student of the alto saxophone would do well to check out The Classic Guide to Strategy, Vol. 3: The Fire Book. It demonstrates in yet another way that John Zorn is truly one of the masters of his instrument."

Track listing

Personnel
John Zorn – alto saxophone

References

Albums produced by John Zorn
John Zorn live albums
2004 live albums
Tzadik Records live albums